The Bainimarama government was the government of Fiji from 2014 until 2022. It was led by Frank Bainimarama.

History
Following the 2014 general election, Bainimarama and his cabinet were officially sworn in on 22 September.

Following the 2018 general election, he was sworn in again for a second term on 20 November.

Cabinet

References

Cabinets established in 2014
Bainimarama